Johnny O'Connor (born 9 February 1980) is an Irish rugby union coach and former player. He is currently a strength and conditioning coach at his former club Connacht, having previously performed that role at football clubs Arsenal and Galway United.

During his playing career he was primarily a flanker. O'Connor spent most of his career with Irish provincial side Connacht, making over 100 appearances across two stints with the team. He also spent four seasons with English Premiership side Wasps in between. He also played amateur club rugby for Galwegians and Galway Corinthians.

He made his debut for in 2004 against South Africa. He made 12 appearances for Ireland, and was part of the 2006 team that won the Triple Crown. O'Connor was named 2005 Irish Rugby Union Players' Association player of the year.

O'Connor received his secondary education from Garbally College and is also a graduate of Setanta College.

References

External links
Connacht Profile
Pro 12 Profile
ERC Profile
Wasps profile
Ireland profile
RBS 6 Nations profile
Sporting Heroes profile
itsrugby stats

1980 births
Living people
Connacht Rugby players
Connacht Rugby non-playing staff
Galwegians RFC players
Irish rugby union players
Ireland international rugby union players
People from Galway (city)
Rugby union flankers
Rugby union players from County Galway
Rugby union strength and conditioning coaches
Wasps RFC players
People educated at Garbally College